Lemie is a comune (municipality) in the Metropolitan City of Turin in the Italian region Piedmont, located about  northwest of Turin.

Lemie borders the following municipalities: Ala di Stura, Balme, Mezzenile, Usseglio, Viù, and Condove.

References

Cities and towns in Piedmont